The Ministry of Privatisation is a Pakistan Government's federal and executive level ministry created on 4 August 2017 by Shahid Khaqan Abbasi. The ministry was created by separating the privatisation division from the Ministry of Finance, Revenue, Economic Affairs, Statistics and Privatisation (now Ministry of Finance, Revenue and Economic Affairs).

List of Privatisation Ministers

Departments
Privatisation Commission

References

 

Federal government ministries of Pakistan